Apostolos Terzis (born 13 March 1971) is a Greek professional football manager who is currently serving as manager at Super League club Aris.

Managerial career
After an undistinguished player career he became head coach of Veria's youth team in 2015. During his two years there, he also stepped in as caretaker manager for Veria's first team. In the summer of 2017 he was briefly manager of Sparta, followed by another short tenure as caretaker manager of Veria in the winter of 2018. In the summer of 2018 he signed on as assistant manager of Aris, ending up as caretaker there as well, first in November 2018, then in September–October 2019.

References

1971 births
Living people
Doxa Drama F.C. players
Greek football managers
Veria F.C. managers
A.E. Sparta P.A.E. managers
Aris Thessaloniki F.C. managers
Footballers from Veria
Greek footballers
Association footballers not categorized by position